This is a list of regions of Mali (with 2012 borders) by Human Development Index as of 2021.

Note: Gao Region (including the newly created Ménaka Region) and Kidal Region are grouped and have their own HDI.

See also 

 List of countries by Human Development Index

References 

Mali
Mali
Human Development Index